Zuoying–Jiucheng is a railway station in Kaohsiung, Taiwan served by Taiwan Railways. The station is served by local trains.

Formerly Zuoying, the station was renamed on October 14, 2018, based on the nearby Old City of Zuoying to avoid the confusion with Xinzuoying, when the new underground station was opened.

History
The station was opened on 29 November 1900. The station was last rebuilt in 2018, replacing the temporary structure opened in 2013.

Around the station
 Chi Ming Palace
 Guomao Community

See also
 List of railway stations in Taiwan

References

1900 establishments in Taiwan
Railway stations in Kaohsiung
Railway stations opened in 1900
Railway stations served by Taiwan Railways Administration
Transport infrastructure completed in 2018